John Carlaw (born 6 February 1975) is an Australian former professional rugby league footballer who played in the 1990s and 2000s. A three-quarter back, he played for several Super League and National Rugby League clubs during his career.

Background
Born in Gosford, New South Wales, John Carlaw was an Ourimbah junior.

Playing career
He started playing top level professional rugby league with the Hunter Mariners club in the Australian Super League competition of 1997. Following the disbanding of that club upon the creation of the National Rugby League, he joined another new venture team, the Melbourne Storm for their first season.

In 1999, Carlaw moved to the Balmain Tigers for their final year before they merged with Western Suburbs Magpies to form the Wests Tigers club.  Carlaw played in Balmain's final ever game as a stand-alone entity which was a 42-14 loss against Canberra.

In 2000, Carlaw played in the Wests Tigers first ever game which was a 24-24 draw against Brisbane.

In 2002, Carlaw moved to the New Zealand Warriors. He played at centre their 2002 NRL Grand Final loss to the Sydney Roosters at the end of the season. He played another season with New Zealand before moving to the St. George Illawarra Dragons for his final year in 2004. He played in his 150th first grade game for the Dragons against his old club, the Warriors, on 14 August 2004.

References

External links
John Carlaw at yesterdayshero.com.au
John Carlaw at nrlstats.com

1975 births
Living people
Australian rugby league players
Balmain Tigers players
Hunter Mariners players
Melbourne Storm players
New Zealand Warriors players
Rugby league centres
Rugby league players from Gosford, New South Wales
Rugby league wingers
St. George Illawarra Dragons players
Wests Tigers players